Lutz Wingert (born 1958) is a German philosopher who is sometimes identified as one of the "Third Generation" of the Frankfurt School of philosophy. He is a professor of philosophy focusing on practical philosophy at the Swiss Federal Institute of Technology Zurich and a member of the Zentrum Geschichte des Wissens (Centre for the History of Knowledge). He is a former student of, and a co-author with, Jürgen Habermas, a founding member of the Frankfurt School. Wingert is a former chair of practical philosophy at the University of Dortmund. Along with Wilfried Hinsch, he edits the Ideen & Argumente series.

In 1998, he was awarded the Karl Jaspers Prize. In 2009 he helped chair a Habermas conference in Pécs, Hungary. In March 2011, he co-chaired the Rhetorics and Therapy conference.

Bibliography

Books
 Revision of the author's thesis, Frankfurt am Main, 1990-1991

Series editor

Articles in journals

*

Articles in newspapers

References

External links

1958 births
German philosophers
Living people
Academic staff of ETH Zurich
Frankfurt School
Goethe University Frankfurt alumni
German male writers